Loren Stillman (born June 14, 1980) is a jazz saxophonist and composer. He has received two Outstanding Performance Awards (1996 and 1998) and the Rising Star Jazz Artist Award (2004) from Down Beat Magazine. and received the CMA/ASCAP Award for Adventurous Programming and the ASCAP Young Jazz Composers Award in 2005.

Biography
Stillman was born in 1980 in London, England, and raised in Croton-on-Hudson, New York. He received scholarships to attend the Manhattan School of Music in 1998 and the New School University in 2002.

He received two Outstanding Performance Awards in 1996 and 1998 and the Rising Star Jazz Artist Award in 2004 from Down Beat Magazine. He was a semifinalist in the 2002 Thelonious Monk Saxophone Competition and in 2005 he received the CMA/ASCAP Award for Adventurous Programming and the ASCAP Young Jazz Composers Award.

He is hailed as "a writer and a stylist that has found a previously unoccupied slot in the jazz spectrum." (Jazz Review UK) Stillman has been recognized as one of today's truly original creative voices by The New York Times, Downbeat Magazine, JazzMan, Jazziz, JazzThing, Jazz-Times and National Public Radio. A former student of Lee Konitz and David Liebman, he has performed and recorded throughout the United States, Europe and Japan with his own ensembles, and with those led by Charlie Haden, Carla Bley, Paul Motian, John Abercrombie, Andy Milne’s Dapp Theory, Michele Rosewoman, Joe Lovano, Eivind Opsvik, Tyshawn Sorey, Samo Salamon, Vic Juris and The Village Vanguard Jazz Orchestra.

It Could Be Anything (2005, Fresh Sound) and The Brothers’ Breakfast (2006, Steeplechase) received critical acclaim from The New York Times, and four star awards from BBC Jazz Review and Downbeat Magazine. Stillman has been a featured artist on WKCR, Weekend America and LIU Radio programming.

Discography

As leader
Cosmos (1997). Loren Stillman Quartet. Soul Note Records. OCLC: 41124309
Gin Bon (2003). The Loren Stillman Quartet with John Abercrombie. Fresh Sounds Records. OCLC: 53381154
How Sweet It Is (2003). Loren Stillman Quartet. Nagel-Heyer Records. OCLC: 56605789
It Could Be Anything (2005). Loren Stillman. Fresh Sound Records. OCLC: 63165502
Jam Session Vol. 15 (2005). Loren Stillman. Steeplechase Records. OCLC: 150290822
The Brother's Breakfast (2006). Loren Stillman. Steeplechase Records. OCLC: 156528260
Trio Alto Volume One (2006). Loren Stillman. Steeplechase Records.OCLC: 145151902
Trio Alto Volume Two (2007). Loren Stillman. Steeplechase Records. OCLC: 156859282
Blind Date (2007). Loren Stillman. Pirouet Records. OCLC: 172985775
Winter Fruits (2009). Loren Stillman. Pirouet Records. OCLC: 502281234

As sideman

With Charlie Haden Liberation Music Orchestra 
Time/Life (Impulse!, 2011-2015 [2016])
With Paul Motian
On Broadway Volume 5 (Winter & Winter, 2009)
With Chris Dingman
Waking Dreams, 2011
With Samo Salamon
2 Alto, (Steeplechase Records, 2014)

References
Notes

Sources

External links
 Loren Stillman official website

1980 births
Living people
American jazz saxophonists
American jazz composers
Musicians from Brooklyn
People from Croton-on-Hudson, New York
Pirouet Records artists
Jazz musicians from New York (state)